Zygaena algira is a species of moth in the Zygaenidae family. It is found in Morocco, Algeria and Tunisia.

The larvae feed on Coronilla juncea.

Subspecies
Zygaena algira algira
Zygaena algira ifranica Hofmann & G. Reiss, 1981
Zygaena algira kebirica Reiss, 1944
Zygaena algira leucopoda Dujardin, 1973
Zygaena algira telealgira Dujardin, 1973

References

Moths described in 1834
Zygaena
Moths of Africa